Dyschirius sphaericollis is a species of ground beetle in the subfamily Scaritinae. It was described by Say in 1823.

References

sphaericollis
Beetles described in 1823